Lampsilis teres, the yellow sandshell or slough sandshell, is a freshwater mussel native to the United States and Mexico. Although it is considered a species of least concern on the IUCN Red List, it is extirpated from (locally extinct) and endangered in parts of its range.

References

teres
Bivalves of North America